Niamh Ní Charra is an Irish fiddler, concertina player and singer from Killarney, Ireland.

Early life
At the age of four, Ní Charra started playing music. She has performed in 2500 shows touring 8 years as a soloist with Riverdance before returning to Ireland.

Her first solo album, Ón Dá Thaobh/From Both Sides, was released in 2007, and was followed by a second, Súgach Sámh / Happy Out, in 2010.  Both albums were well received, after which Ní Charra received awards including Mojo's Top Ten Folk Albums of 2007 and Irish World's Best Trad Music Act 2008,
In 2013, Ní Charra released "Cuz", a tribute to Kerry and Chicago musician, Terry 'Cuz' Teahan.  This album also received positive reviews.

Ní Charra has also  toured as a member of the Carlos Núñez band.

Discography

Solo albums 

2007 Ón Dá Thaobh/From Both Sides
2010 Súgach Sámh / Happy Out
2013 "Cuz"

Collaborations 

2011 The Basque Irish Connection, Ibon Koteron

Guest Roles 

2010 San Patricio (album), The Chieftains
2009 Alborada do Brasil (album), Carlos Núñez
 2016  KeltiK (Album), Xabi Aburruzaga

References

External links
Shetland Folk Festival
Biography
Cast Members · Riverdance

21st-century Irish women singers
Year of birth missing (living people)
Living people
Irish folk musicians
Irish-language singers